Association for Defence of Islamic Revolution Values (Jam`īyat-e Defā` az Arzeshhā-ye Enqelāb-e Eslāmī) was a neo-principlist political party in Iran, founded by Mohammad Reyshahri. The party was defeated in the 1996 parliamentary and the 1997 presidential elections.

The party's line was similar to those of the Combatant Clergy Association, and its core members were former counterparts of Reyshahri at the Ministry of Intelligence. Ali Akbar Aboutorabi Fard, Ruhollah Hosseinian, Mohammad Shariatmadari, Ahmad Pournejati and Ali Razini were among notable members.

References

1996 establishments in Iran
Political parties established in 1996
1999 disestablishments in Iran
Political parties disestablished in 1999
Principlist political groups in Iran
Electoral lists for Iranian legislative election, 1996